EZ Air  is a small regional service airline and Air Ambulance provider BES, founded in May 2000. Is based in Bonaire, with ticket offices in Bonaire and Curaçao.

Services 
EZ Air operated five daily flights between Bonaire and Curaçao, with additional charter flights to sister island Aruba. The Bonaire-Curaçao flight is about a 20- to 23-minute flight.

Since 2012 it has operated Learjet Dedicated Air Ambulance primary transfers to Medellin and Bogota Colombia medical Crew outsourced to Fundacion Mariadall. It is in the process of acquiring an additional Learjet 55. 
It is awaiting return FAA category 1 status to service main land USA for Air Ambulance flights.

EZ Air currently operates flights between Aruba, Bonaire and Curaçao as medical flights transporting passengers between the islands utilizing the BN2. They also operate Learjet flights between the islands as well as to the United States and Colombia.

On June 14, 2018 the board of the Pension Fund for Caribbean Netherlands (PCN) announced, that after a preparatory period of almost 18 months, to invest in the purchase of aircraft for the airline EZ Air. With the loan provided to Bonaire-based Medicair N.V., by means of the Participation Company Caribbean Netherlands (PMCN), established by PCN, two Beechcraft 1900D aircraft will shortly be purchased that will take care of regional flights. In addition, the required working capital is also provided for the start-up of the EZ-Air operation.

The aircraft in question were, until recently, used for flight operations on behalf of Air Canada Express. The aircraft, with 19 seats each, will be used under the brand name EZ-Air for flights between the ABC islands, flights between Bonaire and St. Eustatius and flights to Colombia. The aircraft have been specially selected for their ability to fly directly to various destinations, within an acceptable time and with sufficient comfort. The relatively long distances, for example on the route between Bonaire and St. Eustatius, brought about several requirements for the aircraft, which among other things have a toilet, and reasonable baggage capacity.

The director of Medicair and EZ Air, Rene Winkel, has an enormous experience in local aviation. He previously flew as captain for both the Winair and ALM Antillean Airlines. In addition, with his company Medicair he has been carrying out ambulance flights between Bonaire and Colombia since the year 2000. The name EZ-Air is not new on the islands. In the past, Winkel has been executing flights between Bonaire and Curaçao for several years with two Britten-Norman aircraft.

For PCN there were various considerations to invest in EZ Air. “First, it must be said that this is a solid business case,” said PCN chairman Harald Linkels. “Over the past few months, we have worked intensively with the EZ Air team and together we have looked at the type of aircraft, the routes that can be served and the commercial plan. From the very start we noticed in a positive sense the solidity and the level of detail in the business plan,“ says Linkels.

In addition, Linkels says that the fund mainly wants to invest locally in matters that benefit the islands and the residents. “Although it is regularly stated that aviation is a risky industry, it is also a fact that we as islands can’t do without aviation,” says Linkels. The PCN chairman says it is extremely sour that every time the island picks the bitter fruits of the malaise in aviation on neighboring island of Curaçao. “Let’s be honest. Bonaire is not the priority of most airlines based in Curaçao. As soon as something goes wrong there, as in the case of ALM, DCA, DAE and now Insel, this has dramatic consequences for Bonaire. People can’t leave the island, doctor visits have to be cancelled and doing business out of Bonaire in Curaçao or Aruba has become nearly impossible“ says Linkels. It is also important for St. Eustatius to have a direct and reliable connection with Bonaire.

EZ was granted their Air Operator Certificate (AOC) in mid-December 2019 and started its regular flights as of December 23, 2019. The airline now executes various daily flights between Curaçao, Bonaire and Aruba.

On August 9, 2019 the EZ Air executed a charter flight between Bonaire and Barranquilla and Colombia. The airline has in the meantime received approval to executed to scheduled flights between Curaçao and Barranquilla and expects this route in the last quarter of 2019.

In June 2022, the company announced it had acquired two SAAB 2000 aircraft. These 50-seat planes are planned for use in longer routes, such as to Sint Maarten from either Bonaire or Curacao; their speed and higher cruising altitude will make these destinations more practical than the previous fleet.

Destinations

Fleet

Current fleet 
As of January 2023, the EZ-Air fleet consists of the following:

Former fleet 
Over the years, EZ-Air has operated the following aircraft types:

References 

 https://www.bonaire.nu/2019/04/04/onderhoud-aan-beechcraft-ez-air-bijna-voltooid/

External links 
Bonaire International Airport

Airlines of the Netherlands Antilles
Airlines of Bonaire
2000 establishments in the Netherlands Antilles